The Great Outdoors  may refer to:

 The outdoors as a place of outdoor recreation
 The Great Outdoors (film), a 1988 American comedy film
 The Great Outdoors (Australian TV series), an Australian travel magazine show
 The Great Outdoors (UK TV series), a British comedy series
 The Great Outdoors (magazine)
 "The Great Outdoors", a song from Country Bear Vacation Hoedown

See also
 The Great Indoors (disambiguation)